Myelochroa is a genus of foliose lichens in the family Parmeliaceae. They are commonly known as axil-bristle lichens. It was created in 1987 to contain species formerly placed in genus Parmelina that had a yellow-orange medulla due to the presence of secalonic acids. Characteristics of the genus include tightly attached thalli with narrow lobes, cilia on the axils, and a rhizinate black lower surface. Chemical characteristics are the production of zeorin and related triterpenoids in the medulla. Myelochroa contains about 30 species, most of which grow on bark. The genus has centres of distribution in Asia and North America.

Taxonomy
Myelochroa was originally circumscribed by Yasuhiko Asahina as a subsection of section Hypotrachyna in genus Parmelia. This taxon was later raised to sectional status by Hale in 1976. It was promoted to generic status in 1987 by John Elix and Mason Hale. Nineteen species were originally placed in Myelochroa, including the type species, M. aurulenta.

Myelochroa species are commonly known as "axil-bristle lichens".

Description
Myelochroa lichens are small- to medium-sized foliose lichens. Their thalli comprises somewhat linear to irregularly shaped lobes. The lobes have simple (unbranched), slender, black cilia on the margin, sparsely or densely distributed. These are sometimes confined to lobe axils, other times they are more evenly distributed. The upper surface of the thallus is grey, or blue-grey, sometimes with a yellow tinge; this yellowish colour, if present, is more likely to be under the apothecia or close to the algal layer. The medulla is yellow-orange. The lower thallus surface is black and covered with mostly unbranched rhizines. The apothecia are lecanorine, with a reddish-brown cup that lacks perforations. The ascospores, which number eight per ascus, are simple, ellipsoid, colourless, and measure 5–8 by 8–14 μm.

The upper cortex contains the lichen acids atranorin, chloroatranorin, and secalonic acid. The medulla contains hopane triterpene compounds such as zeorin and leucotylic acid as well as secalonic acid A. The presence of these triterpenes distinguishes this genus from Parmelina, and its segregate genera, including Parmelinella, and Parmelinopsis. secalonic acid A is a yellow pigment that reacts C+ yellow and K+ yellow with lichen spot tests.

Habitat and distribution
Most Myelochroa lichens are corticolous. They are largely found in temperate locations, with centre of distribution in eastern Asia and eastern North America. Twelve species of Myelochroa are found in South Korea. The type species, Myelochroa aurulenta, is found throughout the world in temperate forests.

Species

Myelochroa amagiensis  
Myelochroa aurulenta  – widespread
Myelochroa coreana  – South Korea; Malaysia
Myelochroa crassata 
Myelochroa crenulata 
Myelochroa degelii 
Myelochroa denegans  – Asia; Australia
Myelochroa entotheiochroa  – Asia
Myelochroa galbina  – Asia; North America
Myelochroa hayachinensis  – Jeju Island
Myelochroa ibukiensis  – Japan
Myelochroa immiscens 
Myelochroa indica  – India
Myelochroa irrugans  – Asia
Myelochroa leucotyliza  – Asia
Myelochroa macrogalbinica  – India
Myelochroa metarevoluta  – Asia; USA
Myelochroa nothofagi 
Myelochroa obsessa (Ach.) 
Myelochroa perisidians  – Asia
Myelochroa radiculata 
Myelochroa rhytidodes 
Myelochroa salazinica  – China
Myelochroa sayanensis  – Siberia
Myelochroa siamea  – Thailand
Myelochroa sibirica  – Siberia
Myelochroa sikkimensis  – India
Myelochroa sinica  – China
Myelochroa subaurulenta 
Myelochroa supraflava  – Brazil
Myelochroa upretii  – India
Myelochroa xantholepis  – Asia

The taxon once known as Myelochroa lindmanii  has been analysed molecularly and shown to belong to the genus Parmelinella.

References

Parmeliaceae
Lichen genera
Lecanorales genera
Taxa described in 1952
Taxa named by Yasuhiko Asahina